The 1914 New Mexico A&M Aggies football team was an American football team that represented New Mexico College of Agriculture and Mechanical Arts (now known as New Mexico State University) during the 1914 college football season.  In their first year under head coach Clarence W. Russell, the Aggies compiled a 4–2–1 record and outscored all opponents by a total of 80 to 29.

Schedule

References

New Mexico AandM
New Mexico State Aggies football seasons
New Mexico AandM Aggies football